Kingsley Dogo Michael (born 26 August 1999) is a Nigerian footballer who plays as a midfielder for Austrian club SV Ried on loan from the Italian club Bologna and the Nigeria national team

Club career
He joined Italian club Bologna on 29 August 2017 and was assigned to their Under-19 team. At the end of the 2017–18 Serie A season he made some bench appearances for Bologna's senior squad, but did not see any time on the field.

On 15 August 2018, he joined Serie B club Perugia on a season-long loan. He made his Serie B debut for Perugia on 24 August 2018 in a game against Brescia as a 79th-minute substitute for Raffaele Bianco.

He made his Serie A debut for Bologna on the opening day of the 2019–20 season, he started the game against Verona on 25 August 2019.

On 2 September 2019, Michael joined Cremonese on loan until 30 June 2020.

On 1 February 2021, Michael moved to Serie B side Reggina, on a loan deal until the end of the season.

On 9 August 2022, Michael was loaned to SV Ried in Austria.

International
He represented Nigeria national under-17 football team at the 2015 African U-17 Championship, where Nigeria finished 4th, and 2015 FIFA U-17 World Cup, which Nigeria won. Michael scored a goal in the 3–0 quarterfinal victory over Brazil, but did not appear in the semifinal or final.

He made his debut for the Nigeria national football team on 7 September 2021 in a World Cup qualifier against Cape Verde, a 2–1 away victory. He started the game and played the whole match.

References

External links
 

1999 births
People from Owerri
Living people
Nigerian footballers
Nigeria youth international footballers
Nigeria international footballers
Association football midfielders
Abuja F.C. players
Bologna F.C. 1909 players
A.C. Perugia Calcio players
U.S. Cremonese players
Reggina 1914 players
SV Ried players
Serie A players
Serie B players
Nigerian expatriate footballers
Expatriate footballers in Italy
Nigerian expatriate sportspeople in Italy
Expatriate footballers in Austria
Nigerian expatriate sportspeople in Austria
Sportspeople from Imo State